The 1958 Paris–Nice was the 16th edition of the Paris–Nice cycle race and was held from 10 March to 16 March 1958. The race started in Paris and finished in Nice. The race was won by Fred De Bruyne of the Carpano team.

General classification

References

1958
1958 in road cycling
1958 in French sport
March 1958 sports events in Europe